Sivar (also Romanized as Sīvar) is a village in Padena-ye Sofla Rural District, Padena District, Semirom County, Isfahan Province, Iran. At the 2006 census, its population was 932, in 233 families.

References 

Populated places in Semirom County